Firefly (stylised as firefly) is a low-cost carrier subsidiary of Malaysia Airlines that offers flights within Malaysia, as well as to Indonesia, Singapore, and Thailand.
 Firefly operates from its main hub at Sultan Abdul Aziz Shah Airport in Subang and from its secondary hub at Penang International Airport. The airline's first flight was on 3 April 2007, from Penang to Kota Bharu. The company slogan is Beyond Convenience.

Destinations

Firefly offers domestic flights from Penang to Langkawi, Kota Bharu, Subang, and to the international destinations Banda Aceh in Indonesia and Phuket in Thailand. Its flights from Subang serve Penang, Langkawi, Alor Setar, Johor Bahru, Kuala Terengganu, Kota Bharu and Singapore.

The airline briefly operated jet aircraft in 2011, offering flights to Kota Kinabalu, Kuching, Sandakan and Sibu from Kuala Lumpur International Airport and internationally to Bandung and Surabaya via Johor Bahru. Acting as a low-cost arm for Malaysia Airlines, the airline planned to include destinations in Vietnam, Cambodia, Laos, Philippines, China, India and Taiwan by 2015.

Domestically, the airline previously served an extensive intra-peninsula connection from its turboprop secondary hub in Penang and Johor Bahru to most major cities in Peninsular Malaysia. Nonetheless, following the major restructuring of the company, the airline decided to axe its jet operations by the end of 2011 and halt its planned turboprop expansion to Bangkok–Don Mueang (via Kota Bharu), Bengkulu, Jambi and Pangkal Pinang.

Firefly operates the only scheduled passenger flights from Singapore's Seletar Airport since 2019, flying to its Subang hub using turboprop aircraft. In the same year, the airline announced its interest to commence a new operation to Betong Airport in Thailand from Kuala Lumpur-Subang.

In October 2020, the company has announced the resumption of its jet service from January 2021. Concentrating secondary routes from Penang International Airport, the airline selected Kota Kinabalu, Kuching and Johor Bahru as its pioneer destinations.
In March 2022, Firefly announced that they will be flying from Penang to Kota Kinabalu and Kuching using their B737-800 aircraft starting April 2022. On 11 April 2022, Firefly had its B737-800 inaugural passenger flight from Johor to Penang.

Other than that, Firefly said they also have plans to make Kota Kinabalu International Airport their secondary hub by 2023.

In the past, the airline has operated scheduled passenger services to Ipoh, Kerteh, Kuantan, Malacca, Sandakan and Sibu in Malaysia; Bandung, Batam, Padang and Pekanbaru, Indonesia; and Hat Yai, Hua Hin and Koh Samui in Thailand.

Fleet
, Firefly operates the following aircraft:

Fleet history

A revival of the airline's route was commenced in 2021, now operated via Penang International Airport as its main hub.

Firefly started operations with two 50-seater Fokker 50 aircraft. It also took delivery of a third leased Fokker 50 aircraft to expand its services.

On 26 June 2007, Malaysia Airlines signed an agreement for the acquisition of ten ATR 72-500 aircraft with options for ten more (which was exercised), to replace the Fokker 50s. The aircraft started to arrive from 11 August 2008, with five delivered in 2008, five in 2009, four in 2010 and the rest in 2011. All Fokker F50s retired by the end of 2008.

On 25 August 2010, Firefly announced that it would take up four ATR 72s in the option clause of the purchase agreement. On 8 November 2010, Firefly announced an order for 30 Boeing 737-800 aircraft from year-end to 2015 as part of its expansion into east Malaysia initially, and into regional markets in the future. Firefly's first Boeing 737-800 arrived in December 2010 and began its operations on 15 January 2011.

On 16 August 2011, Firefly announced that it would only operate the ATR aircraft from Subang and Penang, and cease its Boeing 737-800 and Boeing 737-400 flights. Jet operations were discontinued in accordance with a restructuring-of-services agreement made between Malaysia Airlines (Firefly's parent company) and AirAsia. On 16 September 2011, Firefly ceased the Johor Bahru – Kuching route. Other Boeing 737 services, including Kuala Lumpur – Kuching, Kuala Lumpur – Kota Kinabalu and Kuala Lumpur – Jakarta, were transferred to Malaysia Airlines in October 2011.

On 18 December 2012, MASwings' parent company, Malaysia Airlines, ordered 36 ATR 72-600s for its subsidiaries. Twenty of the ordered aircraft will be delivered to Firefly while the remaining sixteen will enter service with MASwings.

In October 2020, the Malaysia Aviation group (MAG) had announced that the airline will recommence its jet operations in the first quarter of 2021. There will be ten jets in fleet.

References

External links

 Karim, F.N., "Firefly to start services April 2", Business Times, 15 March 2006
 Yeow, J. & Francis, I., "MAS to launch Firefly", The Sun, 15 March 2006
 Official website
 Firefly Latest Timetable

2007 establishments in Malaysia
Airlines of Malaysia
Low-cost carriers
Malaysia Airlines
Privately held companies of Malaysia
Airlines established in 2007
Malaysian companies established in 2007